Radio Crne Gore is a radio station in Montenegro. It is part of Radio Televizija Crne Gore (Radio-Television of Montenegro). Radio Crne Gore broadcasts from Podgorica.

History
In 1949, Radio Titograd was formed. In 1963, RTV Titograd was established, making Radio Titograd a part of it.  In 1990, Radio Titograd changed its name to Radio Crne Gore. RTV Titograd eventually was renamed to Radio Televizija Crne Gore, making Radio Crna Gora a part of it ever since.

Radio Montenegro Trophy
In 2014, Football Association of Montenegro, together with Radio Montenegro founded Radio Montenegro Trophy, commemorating the 70th anniversary of the radio. The trophy is awarded to best scorer of the Montenegrin First League.

External links

Radio stations in Montenegro
Mass media in Podgorica